St. Mary's Parish is a church in Prince Edward Island, Canada.

Roman Catholic churches in Prince Edward Island